E 502 is a European B class road in France, connecting the cities Le Mans – Tours.

Route 
 
 E50, E402 E501 Le Mans
 E05, E60, E604 Tours

External links 
 UN Economic Commission for Europe: Overall Map of E-road Network (2007)
 International E-road network

International E-road network
Roads in France